Virginia Portia Royall Inness-Brown (1901–1990), also known as Virginia Inness-Brown was a proponent of the arts and first recipient of the Handel Medallion of New York City, in 1959.

Biography

Virginia Portia Royall was born in Medford, Massachusetts on May 4, 1901, the daughter of John Allen Crosskeys Royall and Agatha Caroline Freeman.  She married New York publisher Hugh Alwyn Inness-Brown Sr. on March 26, 1921, in Lillington, North Carolina.  They lived in Plandome Manor, Nassau County, New York and had four children: Page Inness-Brown (Tharpe), Hugh Alwyn Inness-Brown Jr, Virginia Inness-Brown (Conn), and Constance Inness-Brown Von Valkenburg. Her granddaughter Elizabeth Inness-Brown is a novelist and educator. Virginia's husband, Hugh, died of a heart attack in their New York home in 1972. Virginia died of congestive heart failure in Damariscotta, Maine on August 8, 1990.

Cultural activities

Inness-Brown was a philanthropist listed in the social register.
She was also  a member and officer of the American National Theatre and Academy (ANTA).  She served as the vice-chairman of the International Cultural Exchange of ANTA, 1954–63, national vice-president, 1963–66, vice-chairman, Performing Arts Program "Salute to France", 1954–55, and was chairman of the Drama, Dance, and Theatre Panels of ANTA.  She was the international delegate of ANTA to Poland in 1963. In 1966, Inness-Brown was the president and chairman of the American corporation for the first Festival of Negro Arts, also known as the World Festival of Black Arts, held in Dakar, Senegal, a role controversial in the international community.

References

Commanders Crosses of the Order of Merit of the Federal Republic of Germany
1901 births
1990 deaths
People from Medford, New York
People from Plandome Manor, New York